Iñaki Cañal García (born 30 September 1997) is a Spanish atlhete specialising in the 400 metres.

International competitions

References

1997 births
Living people
Spanish male sprinters
People from Gijón